The 1960–61 Volleyball Women's European Cup was the inaugural edition of the European premier championship for women's volleyball clubs. Dynamo Moscow defeated AZS-AWF Warszawa in a two-leg final on April 27 and June 8, 1961, to become the first champion of the competition.

Preliminary round

Quarter-finals

Semifinals

Final

References

European Cup
European Cup
CEV Women's Champions League